Thomas Tillotson (May 5, 1832) was an American physician and politician.

Life
Born in the Province of Maryland around 1751 or 1752, Tillotson received a thorough education, studied medicine, and practiced. He was the great great nephew of the Archbishop of Canterbury John Tillotson. In 1776, he was commissioned as a First lieutenant in the Maryland Militia, and served during the American Revolutionary War.  He was appointed by Congress as a physician and surgeon general of the Northern Department of the Continental Army in 1780, and served until the close of the war.  Afterward, he settled in Rhinebeck, New York and engaged in the practice of medicine.

In 1779, he married Margaret Livingston (1749–1823, sister of Chancellor Robert R. Livingston).  Their children included Robert, John, and Janette. Janette was the wife of Judge James Lynch.

A Federalist, he represented Dutchess County in the New York State Assembly in 1788.  In 1790, State Senator Anthony Hoffman died, and Tillotson was elected to fill the vacancy.  He was a member of the State Senate from 1791 to 1799,  and served as a member of the Council of Appointment in 1791.

He was elected as a Democratic-Republican to the 7th United States Congress in 1800, but resigned on August 10, 1801, before Congress met, to become Secretary of State of New York.  He remained in this office until March 15, 1806, and again from February 16, 1807, to February 1, 1808.

He died in Rhinebeck on May 5, 1832, was buried in the Livingston family vault in the cemetery at the Dutch Reformed Church in Rhinebeck.

Linwood
Tillotson's estate in Rhinebeck was known as "Linwood". It was originally part of the Artsen-Kip Patent. Tillotson purchased from Isaac Van Etten the southerly lot forming part of the lands which had been granted in 1688 by Governor Dongan to Gerrit Aertsen and others. It was bounded on the south and west by the Hudson River and on the east by the stream known as Landsmans Kill, which also formed the westerly boundary of the Beekman patent. On this property Dr. Tillotson in the years 1788-1790 laid out a country place and called it "Linwood." His house commanded a magnificent view of the river.

He then acquired 150 acres of the Beekman land lying between Landsmans Kill and Fallsburgh Creek. This plateau, between the two streams, with extensive views of the Catskill mountains and Hudson river, became known as Linwood Hill. At the mouth of Landsmans Kill he built a dock and mill, where grain was ground. Dr. Tillotson also obtained at this time another part of the Beekman lands, twenty-nine acres of woodland lying east of Fallsburgh Creek, where two beautiful waterfalls bring it to the river level. This portion of the property became known as "Glenburn".

In 1830, Tillotson gave "Glenburn" to his granddaughter, Julia Lynch, who later married Rev. Stephen Olin, President of Wesleyan University. After Tillotson's death, "Lindon Hill" was sold to Federal Vanderburgh.

References

Sources

Books

Internet

External links
 The Papers of Robert Morris, 1781-1784: April 16-July 20, 1782, by Robert Morris
Rhinebeck, by Michael Frazier

See also
 List of members-elect of the United States House of Representatives who never took their seats

|-

|-

1750s births
1832 deaths
18th-century American physicians
Livingston family
Democratic-Republican Party members of the United States House of Representatives from New York (state)
Members of the New York State Assembly
New York (state) state senators
People from Rhinebeck, New York
Secretaries of State of New York (state)